= Cécile Mballa Eyenga =

Cameroonian diplomat

Cécile Mballa Eyenga is a diplomat from Cameroon. Eyenga was the secretary general of Cameroon's Ministry of External Relations. In 1998, she became the second secretary for Cameroon's permanent representative at the United Nations in New York.
